Bryan Eric Hinkle (born June 4, 1959 in Long Beach, California) is a former professional American football player who played outside linebacker for twelve seasons for the Pittsburgh Steelers. He played college football for the University of Oregon. He currently resides in the South Hills section of Pittsburgh, Pennsylvania.

References

1959 births
Living people
Players of American football from Long Beach, California
American football linebackers
Oregon Ducks football players
Pittsburgh Steelers players